Ekinci is a village in the Kâhta District, Adıyaman Province, Turkey. The village is populated by Kurds of the Canbegan tribe and had a population of 158 in 2021.

The hamlet of Üçkardeş is attached to Ekinci.

References

Villages in Kâhta District
Kurdish settlements in Adıyaman Province